Joseph “Joe” Richard Wright was a member of the Kentucky State Senate from 1976 to 1992 representing the state’s 5th district.  From 1981 to 1992 he was the Majority Floor Leader for the Democratic Party.

Early life
Wright graduated from Breckinridge County High School where he was a member of the Future Farmers of America.  He then attended the University of Kentucky where he graduated from the College of Agriculture in 1962 with a Bachelor’s Degree in agriculture business.  While at Kentucky he was president of the Phi Kappa Tau fraternity chapter, a member of the freshmen basketball team, a member of Block and Bridle, and a member of the livestock judging team.  After graduating, he returned to his home in Harned, Kentucky and became a small farmer.  As a young man he was also a member of the United States Marine Corps Reserve.

Political career

Kentucky State Senate
Wright was first sworn in to the Kentucky State Senate in 1976 and first served on the Agricultural and Education committees.  In the 1975 elections he defeated incumbent Earl Glenn in a three-way primary race and then defeated Bill Crowell in the general election.  At the time, the district comprised precincts in Breckinridge, Grayson, Hardin, Hart, Meade, and Ohio counties.

In 1978, Wright joined a group of Democratic senators, led by John M. Berry, in a push for legislative independence from the executive branch.  This was a direct challenge to their party’s leadership.  Berry and Wright were joined by senators Tom Easterly, Lowell Hughes, David Karem, Danny Meyer, Mike Moloney, and Ed O'Daniel.  The group called themselves the Blacksheep Squadron and was joined by the Senate’s eight Republicans.  They demanded that the legislature be open, transparent, accountable and, above all, independent (that bills be heard regardless of the governor’s opinion).  Their movement was unsuccessful until the election of John Y. Brown Jr. as governor in 1979.  Brown was a businessman with no political experience who had no desire to run the legislature.

In 1979 he defeated Republican Jim Allen in the general election after not facing a challenger in the primaries.

In 1981, Wright was elected party floor leader and would spend the next eleven years in that position.  During this time he served on the Small Business committee and became chairman of the Agriculture committee.  He was also able to provide funding for the University of Kentucky to purchase the Pin Oak Farm in Woodford County which became UK’s research farm and the addition of several buildings to the Future Farmers of America camp in Hardinsburg.

In 1983 he defeated Bob Chambliss in the primary election and Mel Mangan in the general election.  In 1988, he ran unopposed in both the primary and general elections.

1996 Kentucky's 2nd congressional district election
Wright retired from the state senate in 1992 with the intent on leaving politics.  However, with the death of William H. Natcher and the election of Republican Ron Lewis in 1994 he was urged to run for the congressional seat.

Wright’s campaign was hampered by President Bill Clinton’s stance on tobacco.  Tobacco was a major cash crop in the district, which made Clinton and the national Democratic party unpopular.  Wright campaigned across the district at tobacco warehouses and fields.  Lewis even said, "My opponent's biggest problem is his party's stand on tobacco."

Wright lost the election to Lewis with a vote total of 125,433 to 90,483.

Other public posts
Wright would later serve as Chairman of the Breckinridge County School Board.  In 2012, he was appointed by Governor Steve Beshear to the Kentucky Tax Reform Commission.  He has also been chairman of the Meade County Riverport Authority, a member of the Kentucky State Fair Board, and the Kentucky Council for Agricultural Research, Extension and Teaching.

Non political activity

Business
Wright is the co-owner of a John Deere tractor dealership with his brother Ben that has four locations in Kentucky (Hardinsburg, Owensboro, Bowling Green, and Glasgow) and three in Indiana (Corydon, Seymour, and Orleans).  He owns one of the largest farms in Breckinridge County, and the state.  He is a former co-owner of WXBC (FM) radio station in Hardinsburg.

Agricultural
He served on the board of directors of the Burley Tobacco Growers Cooperative from 1983-1995 and was president in 1995.  He is also a founding member of the Kentucky Future Farmers of America Foundation Board and served on the board for twelve years.

Honors
Kentucky Farm Bureau Distinguished Service Award
Thomas Poe Cooper Distinguished Farm Leadership Award
UK Agriculture Alumni Association’s Distinguished Alumni Award
Kentucky Rural Electrical Cooperatives’ Distinguished Rural Kentuckian

References

Living people
University of Kentucky alumni
Democratic Party Kentucky state senators
People from Breckinridge County, Kentucky
Kentucky Wildcats men's basketball players
Farmers from Kentucky
Businesspeople from Kentucky
United States Marine Corps reservists
Year of birth missing (living people)